Boeckenberg Korfbal Club is an amateur korfball club from Deurne, Belgium. The club hs been dominating Belgian korfball since the 2006-07 season, only losing the title once , to Scaldis in the 2009-10 season. In the seventies the club also won two titles.

Squad (current)
 Player / Head coach:  Hans Leeuwenhoek

Honours
 1973-74, 1975-76, 2006-07, 2007-08, 2008-09, 2010-11 - Belgian Champion (6 times)

Europa Cup
As national champion, the club has participated 9 times in the IKF Europa Cup. On each participation, Boeckenberg won the silver medal in this competition for European club champions.

Season by season

External links
Boeckenberg KC
Belgium Korfball

Korfball teams
Korfball in Belgium